Robert Paynswick was appointed Dean of Christ Church, Dublin by Henry VIII  on 11 May 1541; and died in 1543.

References

Deans of Christ Church Cathedral, Dublin
16th-century Irish Anglican priests
1543 deaths